One Rockwell West Tower is a condominium in Rockwell Center, Makati, Philippines. The building part is of the One Rockwell building complex. It is the tallest in the complex and it is one of the tallest skyscraper in the Philippines, rising  from ground.

Design 
The tower is elliptical in shape and is built using the usual steel and glaze. Balconies are built at the peak of the tower. The bulk of the tower is covered in a blue tinted glaze but clear glazing will be used to cover the roof.

The facade overrun allows the using of a rooftop pool and a decking area. The top of the tower also features two levels.

References

See also 
 List of tallest buildings in the Philippines

Skyscrapers in Makati
Residential skyscrapers in Metro Manila
Residential buildings completed in 2010